Noorda is a genus of moths of the family Crambidae, and the only genus in the subfamily Noordinae.

Species
Noorda aeanalis West, 1931
Noorda affinis Rothschild, 1916
Noorda anthophilalis Strand, 1909
Noorda apiensis Rebel, 1915
Noorda arfakensis Kenrick, 1912
Noorda atripalpalis Zerny in Rebel & Zerny, 191
Noorda blitealis Walker, 1859
Noorda caradjae (Rebel, 1902)
Noorda diehlalis Marion & Viette, 1956
Noorda margaronialis Hampson in Hampson, 1912
Noorda palealis Viette, 1957
Noorda purpureiplagialis Rothschild, 1916
Noorda senatoria (Meyrick, 1932)
Noorda trimaculalis Amsel, 1965
Noorda unipunctalis Amsel, 1963

Former species
Noorda moringae Tams, 1938
Noorda villiersi Marion, 1957

References

 Natural History Museum Lepidoptera genus database

Crambidae genera
Taxa named by Francis Walker (entomologist)